Iryna Yakovlevna Kyrylina (25 March 1953 – 4 September 2017) was a Ukrainian composer. She was born in Dresden, Germany, and studied with R.I. Vereschagin at the Kiev Musical College, and with M.V. Dremlyuga at the Kiev Conservatory, graduating in 1977. After completing her studies, she taught at a Kiev Music School and directed children’s choirs. Since 1982 she has worked as a full-time composer.

Honors and awards
Laureate of the Ukrainian Republican Komsomol M.Ostrovsky Prize (1988)
Honored in Arts of Ukraine (1999)
Winner of the Ukrainian President’s Prize (1999)
First Prize International Puppet-Show Competition (1988)
International Children’s Festival Prize (1993–1997)
All-Ukrainian Radio Festival Song of the Year (1998–2001)

Works
Kyrylina was among the first Ukrainians to compose song cycles for voice and orchestra. She also writes stage music, often incorporating Ukrainian songs into her compositions. Selected works include:

Chamber Cantata no.1 ‘Iz zvyozdnogo kovsha’ (From the Starry Ladle) (M. Tsvetayeva), Soprano, chamber ensemble, 1977
Sonata, violin, piano, 1980
Chamber Cantata no.3 ‘Znaki pamyati’ (Signs of Memory) (N. Turbina), Soprano, chamber orchestra, 1986
Sinfonietta, 13 strings, 1987
Chamber Cantata no.4 ‘Memoria’ (A. Akhmatova), Soprano, chamber ensemble, 1988
3 portreta (3 Portraits) (mono-op, L. Kostenko), Mezzo-soprano, chamber orchestra, 1988
Chamber Cantata no.5 ‘Molitva’ (Prayer) (canonical texts), Soprano, chorus, orchestra, 1989
Bagatelles, pianoforte, 1990
Sax Quartet, 1990
Raspad (Disintegration), chamber symphony., 1991
Chamber Cantata no.6 ‘Kuznechik’ (The Grasshopper) (V. Khlebnikov), Soprano, clarinet, violin, pianoforte, 1992
Rozmyte bachene (What I have Seen has been Washed Away) (cantata, P. Movchan), children's chorus, male chorus, organ, 1993

References

1955 births
20th-century classical composers
Living people
Ukrainian classical composers
Ukrainian music educators
Women classical composers
Women music educators
20th-century women composers